Putnam County is a county located in the northern part of the state of Florida. As of the 2020 census, the population was 73,321. Its county seat is Palatka.

Putnam County comprises the Palatka, FL Micropolitan Statistical Area, which is included in the Jacksonville-St. Marys-Palatka, FL-GA Combined Statistical Area. The county is centrally located between Jacksonville, Gainesville, St. Augustine, and Daytona Beach.

History
Putnam County was created in 1849. It was Florida's 28th county created from parts of St. Johns, Alachua, Orange, Duval, and Marion counties. The county was named for Benjamin A. Putnam, who was an officer in the First Seminole War, a lawyer, Florida legislator, and the first president of the Florida Historical Society. The Putnam County Historical Society has determined that Benjamin A. Putnam is the grandson of Israel Putnam, for whom other counties and places in the United States are named. Benjamin A. Putnam died in the county seat of Palatka in 1869.

Geography

The county contains various sinkhole lakes such as Lake Barco and Lake Suggs, where unconsolidated deposits on the surface have slumped into the highly soluble limestone of the upper Floridan aquifer.

Adjacent counties
 Clay County, Florida – north
 St. Johns County, Florida – northeast
 Flagler County, Florida – east
 Volusia County, Florida – southeast
 Marion County, Florida – southwest
 Alachua County, Florida – west
 Bradford County, Florida – northwest

National protected area
 Ocala National Forest (part)

State Park
 Ravine Gardens
 Dunns Creek

Demographics

As of the 2020 United States census, there were 73,321 people, 29,822 households, and 18,179 families residing in the county.

As of the 2000 United States Census there were 70,423 people, 27,839 households, and 19,459 families residing in the county.  The population density was 98 people per square mile (38/km2).  There were 33,870 housing units at an average density of 47 per square mile (18/km2).  The racial makeup of the county was 77.91% White, 17.04% Black or African American, 0.42% Native American, 0.44% Asian, 0.04% Pacific Islander, 2.94% from other races, and 1.20% from two or more races.  5.92% of the population were Hispanic or Latino of any race.

There were 27,839 households, out of which 28.10% had children under the age of 18 living with them, 52.80% were married couples living together, 12.90% had a female householder with no husband present, and 30.10% were non-families. 25.10% of all households were made up of individuals, and 11.90% had someone living alone who was 65 years of age or older.  The average household size was 2.48 and the average family size was 2.95.

In the county, the age distribution of the population shows 24.60% under the age of 18, 7.70% from 18 to 24, 24.20% from 25 to 44, 25.10% from 45 to 64, and 18.50% who were 65 years of age or older.  The median age was 40 years. For every 100 females there were 97.60 males.  For every 100 females age 18 and over, there were 94.20 males.

The median income for a household in the county was $28,180, and the median income for a family was $34,499. Males had a median income of $29,975 versus $20,955 for females. The per capita income for the county was $15,603.  About 15.80% of families and 20.90% of the population were below the poverty line, including 30.60% of those under age 18 and 13.10% of those age 65 or over.

Ancestry/ethnicity
 the largest self-reported ethnic/ancestry groups in Putnam County, Florida are:

Education
The main campus of St. Johns River State College is located in Palatka (the county seat). First Coast Technical College is public, post secondary vocational school with a campus in Palatka.

When in November 2022 a former Putnam County school resource deputy was accused of sneaking into a student's home to sexually batter her while her mom was at work or asleep, and asking her to dress up as a younger child and call him “daddy”, starting when she was 15 years of age, it was announced that the Florida Criminal Justice Standards & Training Commission would review the case. The case was sent to the Commission by the Putnam County Sheriff, who was seeking to have the deputy's certification as a law enforcement officer permanently revoked.

Libraries
Putnam County is served by the Putnam County Library System which has five branches:
 Palatka (main)
 Bostwick
 Crescent City
 Interlachen
 Melrose

Communities

Cities
 Crescent City
 Palatka

Towns
 Interlachen
 Pomona Park
 Welaka

Census-designated place
 East Palatka

Other unincorporated communities

 Bardin
 Bostwick
 Carraway
 Crossley
 Edgar
 Florahome
 Francis
 Fruitland
 Georgetown
 Grandin
 Hollister
 Huntington
 Johnson Crossroads
 Lake Como
 Mannville
 Melrose
 Orange Mills
 Putnam Hall
 Ridgewood
 Rodman
 San Mateo
 Satsuma
 Springside
 Yelvington

Politics

Voter registration
According to the Secretary of State's office, Republicans are a plurality of registered voters in Putnam County.

Transportation

Airports
The main airport within the county is the Palatka Municipal Airport. Minor and private air strips also exist.

Highways

 is the main local road through eastern Putnam County, running south to north.
 is the hidden route for US 17 within the county and the vicinity.
 is a mostly scenic north and south road that enters the county from Ocala National Forest and terminates with US 17 in Palatka.
 runs west to east through the panhandle into Putnam County east from Hawthorne in Alachua County, and joins US 17/SR 100 in Palatka. 
 runs south to north from SR 20 in McMeekin through Melrose before entering Clay County.
 runs west to east through Gilcrhist and Alachua Counties before entering Putnam County in Melrose and terminating at SR 100 in Putnam Hall. 
 runs northwest to southeast from Clay County southeast of Keystone Heights, passing through Putnam Hall, Florahome, and Palatka where it joins US 17, and later SR 20 in a concurrency into San Mateo where SR 100 (and hidden SR 20) runs southeast towards the Flagler County Line 
 is a west to east route that runs northeast from US 17/SRs 20/100 through Orange Mills and then the St. Johns County Line..

Rail transport
The historic Old Atlantic Coast Line Union Depot is the current Amtrak station in Palatka for Putnam County along the CSX Sanford Subdivision. Originally the station not only served the Atlantic Coast Line Railroad but also served the Seaboard Air Line Railroad, the Southern Railway, Florida East Coast Railroad, and the Ocklawaha Valley Railroad. Additionally, the Edgar Spur of the CSX Wildwood Subdivision enters the western edge of the county from Alachua County.

Navigable waterways
 St. Johns River

Notable people
 

Peter Monroe Hagan (1871–1930), law enforcement officer and served as Putnam County Sheriff

See also
 Drayton Island
 National Register of Historic Places listings in Putnam County, Florida

Notes

References

External links

Government links/Constitutional offices
 Putnam County Board of County Commissioners official website
 Putnam County Supervisor of Elections
 Putnam County Property Appraiser 
 Putnam County Sheriff's Office
 Putnam County Tax Collector
 Putnam County Parks and Recreation

Special districts
 Putnam County School District
 St. Johns River Water Management District

Judicial branch
 Putnam County Clerk of Courts 
 Public Defender, 7th Judicial Circuit of Florida serving Flagler, Putnam, St. Johns, and Volusia counties
  Office of the State Attorney, 7th Judicial Circuit of Florida
  Circuit and County Court for the 7th Judicial Circuit of Florida

Tourism links
 Putnam County Chamber of Commerce

 
Florida counties
1849 establishments in Florida
North Florida
Populated places established in 1849